Jorge Pacce (born 31 May 1965) is a Paraguayan judoka. He competed in the men's lightweight event at the 1996 Summer Olympics.

References

1965 births
Living people
Paraguayan male judoka
Olympic judoka of Paraguay
Judoka at the 1996 Summer Olympics
Place of birth missing (living people)